Coat of arms of Groningen may refer to:

Coat of arms of Groningen
Coat of arms of Groningen (province)